Amoebophilus is a genus of zygomycete fungi that parasitizes amoeba.

Morphology
Amoebophilus species are ectoparasites of amoeba. The thallus is composed of an internal haustorium that can be heart-shaped, globose, or lobose. Trailing chains of four or more conidia are produced from the haustorium. Zygospores are spherical at first and become polyhedral with age.

Ecology
Amoebophilus species have been reported from forest and agricultural soils and freshwater ponds where they infect free living amoeba. Infection begins when a conidium comes in contact with an amoeba. The conidium produces a penetration tube to invade the host and form the haustorium. Once the haustorium is formed, the conidium germinates and gives rise to a chain of conidia. Due to difficulties in identifying amoeba, the host ranges of most species are unknown, with the exception of Amoebophilus simplex, which is restricted to species of Mayorella.

Taxonomy
Amoebophilus species were first observed by Leidy in 1874 who mistook them as part of the amoeba and used them to describe a new genus. In 1902, Penard pointed out that the filaments observed by Leidy were in fact a parasite. The genus was formerly erected by Dangeard in 1910 based on parasitized individuals of Pelomyxa vorax; he named the species after Penard.

Species
Amoebophilus penardii Dangeard
Amoebophilus caudatus Dangeard
Amoebophilus korotneffii Dangeard
Amoebophilus sicyosporus Drechsler
Amoebophilus dangeardii Miura
Amoebophilus simplex Barron

References

Zygomycota
Fungus genera